Archana Udupa is an Indian singer. She sings devotional, classical and film  songs. She is graded artist of All India Radio and Doordarshan. She won Zee TV TVS Sa Re Ga Ma Pa contest of singing in 1998. Archana Udupa is the first person of south Indian origin to win Hindi film song singing contest. As of now she has sung in more than 1000 cassettes and CDs (Albums).

She won the Karnataka State Film Award for Best Female Playback Singer for her song in the film Bhageerathi in 2012.
She also judged for famous singing reality show Kannada Kogile for two seasons along with Chandan Shetty and Sadhu Kokila. She married Sriranga, a lawyer and son of musician Shimoga Subbanna, in 2002.

References

External links
 

Living people
Indian women playback singers
Kannada playback singers
Tulu people
People from Udupi
Singers from Karnataka
Women musicians from Andhra Pradesh
20th-century Indian singers
20th-century Indian women singers
21st-century Indian singers
21st-century Indian women singers
1983 births